Seymour Lake is a lake in the Lake Huron drainage basin in Algoma District, Ontario, Canada. The lake is the source of the Rapid River, which flows via the Mississagi River to Lake Huron. A road, which begins at Highway 129 north of the mouth of the Rapid River, parallels the majority of the river to Seymour Lake

See also
List of lakes in Ontario

References

Lakes of Algoma District